Tezpur University is a Central University located in Tezpur in the North-Eastern state of Assam, India, established by an act of Parliament, in 1994.

History 
The establishment of Tezpur University is considered to be one of the outcomes of the Assam Accord, along with the establishment of Assam University and Indian Institute of Technology Guwahati.

Tezpur University was established, by an Act of Parliament, in 1994. The then prime minister of India, P. V. Narasimha Rao, chaired the opening of the university.

Initially, the university operated from the premises of the Darrang College, in Tezpur. For a while, it also operated from the Tezpur Law College premises. A few months later, the premises of the university was shifted to the present permanent location.

Kalaguru Bishnuprasad Rava (Rabha) donated an ancestral estate of 2500 bigha of land received from the British government in favour of the peasants. The present-day Tezpur University stands on the land donated by him. Recently, in 2013, the university acquired an additional plot of land, extending the current plot.

Campus 
The university campus is at Napaam about 15 km east of Tezpur, the headquarters of the Sonitpur district of Assam. Napaam is an urban area surrounded by people of diverse caste, religion and language. Napaam is linked by a PWD road from the National Highway No. 37A at almost the midpoint between the Kalia-Bhomora bridge and Misson Chariali. Tezpur is linked by road and rail with the rest of the state and the country. There is a tri-weekly flight between Kolkata and Tezpur.

Accommodation 

There are provisions for visitors to stay in the university guest house. Students may choose to stay in any of the men's or women's hostels. The university is primarily a residential university.
The university has five men's hostels (listed in order of construction):
Charaideo Men's Hostel: Named after the burial land of Ahom kings in Sivasagar, Assam.
Nilachal Men's Hostel: Named after the Nilachal Hill in Guwahati
Kanchenjungha Men's Hostel: Named after Kangchenjunga, the third highest mountain in the world (after Mount Everest and K2).
Patkai Men's Hostel: Named after the Patkai-Bum, the Khasi-Jaintia-Garo, and the Lushai hills mountain range in the eastern Himalayas.
Saraighat C. V. Raman Men's Hostel: Named after the Saraighat Bridge at Guwahati and the famous Indian physicist and Nobel laureate Sir C. V. Raman.

There are eight women's hostels:
Bordoichilla Women's hostel: Named after the seasonal storm that occurs in Assam every spring, before and after the festival of Bihu.
Dhansiri Women's hostel: Named after the river Dhansiri
Pragjyotika Women's Hostel: Named after Pragjyotishpur, the name of the capital city of historical Kamrup kingdom.
Suwansiri Women's hostel: Named after the river Subansiri
Kopili Women's Hostel: Named after the river Kopili
New Women's Hostel
Pobitara Madam Curie Women's Hostel: Named after the Pobitara Wildlife Sanctuary and the physicist Marie Curie.
Jiri Women's Hostel

There is also a married-scholars hostel, which is at present serving as a makeshift accommodation for newly recruited faculty of the university.

Communications
E-Rickshaw, the chief mode of public transport in and around Tezpur, runs between Tezpur University and Tezpur city. There is an ASTC bus utility between the university and the ASTC bus stand located at the heart of Tezpur city near the State Bank of India (Main Branch). ASTC and private buses run daily between Tezpur and some other major places like Guwahati (ISBT, Lokhra), Bongaigaon, North Lakhimpur, Dibrugarh, Tinsukia, etc. 20-seater cabs ply between Tezpur and Paltan Bazaar, Guwahati. Dekargaon Railway Station offers a link between Tezpur and to other parts of Assam. Travelers can also opt for flying to and from Tezpur where the nearest airport - Tezpur Airport provides air link with Kolkata and Silchar. For other destinations, the nearest airport is the Lokapriya Gopinath Bordoloi International Airport at Guwahati.

Organisation and administration

Schools and departments
The university has four schools of studies which are divided into 27 departments and additional centers and cells.
 School of Sciences
 School of Humanities & Social Sciences
 School of Management Sciences
 School of Engineering

The School of Sciences is divided into six departments, which provides undergraduate and postgraduate degrees in Science and carry on research in science and mathematics.
 Department of Chemical Sciences
 Department of Mathematical Sciences
 Department of Molecular Biology and Biotechnology
 Department of Pharmacy
 Department of Physics
 Department of Environmental Science

The School of Humanities & Social Sciences provides education as well as diploma, undergraduate, postgraduate, and research programs related to humanities and social sciences in the following departments:
 Department of  Assamese
 Department of Cultural Studies
 Department of  English
 Department of Foreign Languages
 Department of Mass Communication and Journalism
 Department of Sociology
 Department of Hindi
 Department of Education
 Department of Social Work
 Department of Law
 Department of Linguistics and Language Technology

The School of Management Sciences provides education as well as diploma, undergraduate, postgraduate, and research programs related to business management in the following departments:
 Department of Business Administration
 Department of Commerce
 Centre for Disaster Management

The School of Engineering offers courses in engineering and technology. The offering masters and BTech programs in the various disciplines. Admission to the BTech programs is on the basis of JEE (Main). Besides BTech and MTech programs, School of Engineering, the university provides PhD programs in specialized fields.
 Department of Computer Science & Engineering
 Department of Design
 Department of Electrical Engineering
 Department of Electronics and Communication Engineering
 Department of Mechanical Engineering
 Department of Food Engineering and  Technology
 Department of Civil Engineering
 Department of Energy
 Department of Applied Sciences

Special centres and cells
 Centres
Centre for Endangered Languages (CFEL)
Centre for Inclusive Development (CID)
Centre for Innovation Incubation and Entrepreneurship(CIIE)
Centre for Multidisciplinary Research (CMR)
Teaching and Learning Centre (TLC)
Centre for Women Studies (CWS)
Cells
Research & Development (R & D) Cell
Intellectual Property Rights (IPR) Cell
DBT Nodal Centre
ONGC Centre for Petroleum Biotechnology (CPBT)
Bioinformatics Infrastructure Facility (BIF)
Institutional Biotech Hub
Internal Quality Assurance Cell (IQAC)

Academic Profile

Rankings

Tezpur University was ranked 801–1000 in the world by the Times Higher Education World University Rankings of 2020 and 251–300 in Asia. The QS World University Rankings ranked it 281-290 in Asia in 2022. In India it was ranked 90th overall by the National Institutional Ranking Framework of 2022  and 59th among universities.

Student life

Major annual events

National Science Day-inSCIgnis
The science festival of the university organized by the School of Sciences and Students' Science Council (SSC) is a two-day event with competitions for school and undergraduate students. It is one of the biggest science festivals of the entire northeast. The main feature of this festival is the lecture, where the doyen of Indian science and mathematics are invited as speakers. Also, many other events including NERLSE(North East Regional Level Science Exhibition)both for UG and PG level, Thalamus the school quiz, Cerebrum the open science quiz, Theatrix the Sci-fi movie screening and other numerous departmental events are organized during the festival.  Students from all over the region participate in it.

Sampark-The Interface
"SAMPARK... the interface" is the annual national-level B-school event of the Department of Business Administration, organized mainly by the students with active support from the faculty members.

TechXetra

TechXetra is the National Level Annual Technical Festival of the university. TechXetra is a combination of two words- Tech and Xetra. "Tech" refers to the technology and 'Xetra' meaning terrain. It is one of the common platforms in North-East India to showcase knowledge and intellect. A blend of technical and management events, it has cultural events as well. Competitions in the field of robotics, coding, tech quiz, etc. are held which vary from year to year. TechXetra attracts enthusiasts from all over India.

References

External links

 
 Know More About Tezpur

 
Central universities in India
Education in Tezpur
Engineering colleges in Assam
Educational institutions established in 1994
1994 establishments in Assam